Alhassan Koroma (born 9 June 2000) is a Sierra Leonean professional footballer who plays for Spanish club Linense and the Sierra Leone national team as a forward.

International career
Koroma made his full international debut on 17 March 2018 against Iran.

References

External links
 
 

2000 births
Living people
People from Tonkolili District
Sierra Leonean footballers
Association football forwards
East End Lions F.C. players
Segunda División B players
Real Balompédica Linense footballers
Sierra Leone international footballers
Sierra Leonean expatriate footballers
Sierra Leonean expatriates in Spain
Expatriate footballers in Spain